Bangor Teifi is a hamlet in the  community of Llandyfriog, Ceredigion, Wales, which is 63.7 miles (102.5 km) from Cardiff and 184.7 miles (297.2 km) from London. Bangor Teifi is represented in the Senedd by Elin Jones (Plaid Cymru) and the Member of Parliament is Ben Lake (Plaid Cymru).

References

See also
List of localities in Wales by population 

Villages in Ceredigion